May refer to:

Ludwig von Falkenhausen (1844–1936), military governor of Belgium during the German occupation of Belgium in World War I.
Alexander von Falkenhausen (1878–1966), military governor of Belgium during the German occupation of Belgium in World War II.